Women & Songs: 60s Girl Groups is a special album in the Women & Songs franchise.  It was released with Women & Songs: The 80s one week before the official sixth album in the collection.

Overview 
12 girl groups of the 1960s era were featured on this disc.  The popular Dixie Cups tune Chapel of Love introduces things, while The Chiffons feature with He's So Fine.  The Loco-Motion also appears courtesy of Little Eva, and A Lover's Concerto finishes things off care of Toys.

Since songs performed in the 1960s, in general, tend to be shorter than songs produced since the 1980s, this is the shortest CD in terms of playing time in the entire Women & Songs franchise.

Track listing 
 Chapel of Love (Jeff Barry/Ellie Greenwich/Phil Spector) [2:49]
 (performed by The Dixie Cups)
 The Loco-Motion (Gerry Goffin/Carole King) [2:27]
(performed by Little Eva)
 Baby It's You (Burt Bacharach/Hal David/B. Williams) [2:40]
(performed by The Shirelles)
 He's So Fine (Ronald Mack) [1:54]
(performed by The Chiffons)
 The Shoop Shoop Song (Rudy Clark) [2:16]
(performed by Betty Everett)
 The Boy from New York City (George Davis/John T. Taylor) [3:08]
(performed by Ad Libs)
 Tell Him (Bert Russell) [2:38]
(performed by Exciters)
 Remember (Shadow Morton) [2:20]
(performed by Shangri-Las)
 Johnny Angel (Lyn Duddy/Lee Pockriss) [2:22]
(performed by Shelley Fabares)
 Easier Said Than Done (Larry Huff/William Linton) [2:10]
(performed by Essex)
 Chains (Gerry Goffin/Carole King) [2:32]
(performed by Cookies)
 A Lover's Concerto (Sandy Linzer/Denny Randell) [2:42]
(performed by Toys)

References 
 [ Women & Songs: 60s Girl Groups at AllMusic]

2002 compilation albums